Space Raiders, also known as Star Child,  is a 1983 space Western film written and directed by Howard R. Cohen
and produced by Roger Corman. The film was made during the time when many studios were releasing space opera films following the success of Star Wars. However, the film was panned by critics, especially for its reuse of special effects footage and music (composed by James Horner) taken from Corman's 1980 film Battle Beyond the Stars.

Plot 

Captain C.F. "Hawk" Hawkens (Vince Edwards) – a former Space Service Colonel turned pirate – leads his crew on a mission to steal a freighter owned by an interstellar corporation simply referred to as "The Company". During the theft, 10-year-old Peter (David Mendenhall), slips aboard the freighter to hide, and the pirates steal the ship unaware he is aboard. After the freighter rendezvouses with Hawk's ship, the crew fight to save the life of a comrade wounded during the shootout. Meanwhile, Peter comes out of hiding and asks to be taken home.

At first, Hawk considers ransoming the child, but during a skirmish with Company fighters, Hawk's feelings change when Peter courageously volunteers to squeeze into a tight compartment and fixes a damaged power conduit that allows them to escape. Hawk promises to return Peter to his home planet, Procyon III. First, however, Hawk's crew stop to rest at a space station owned by an alien crime lord, Zariatin (Ray Stewart).

On Procyon III, Peter's father meets with The Company's security director who decides to locate the boy with an advanced robot ship. This  massive, fully automated battle cruiser can track an identity tag that Peter wears around his neck.

Back at Zariatin's station, a pair of bounty hunters spot Peter and realize he is a "Company kid" worth a hefty ransom. When Peter wanders off, Flightplan (Thom Christopher), a psychic alien member of Hawk's crew, senses the boy is in danger. When Hawk finds him, Zariatin arrives and is furious a child is snooping around his station. Hawk promises the kid will not be a problem, but threatens to kill Zariatin if he tries to lay a hand on him.

While Hawk and crew relax in the bar, a bored Peter slips out of his cabin and the bounty hunters follow. Meanwhile, Zariatin calls Hawk to remind him that his service fees are long past due. Zeriatin demands that Hawk steal four Company fuel ships from a depot on Regulus V, but to guarantee performance, the boy must remain at the station. Hawk refuses to leave Peter behind, but he agrees to steal the ships. He orders his crew member Amanda (Patsy Pease) to take Peter home in one of ships once the job is accomplished.

Hawk returns to Peter's cabin, but finds the boy missing and races back to the bar. In the meantime, Peter spots the bounty hunters and a chase ensues, but he is captured. Thinking Zeriatin has taken Peter, Hawk confronts him, but just then, Zariatin is alerted that the bounty hunters are making an unauthorized departure which Hawk believes can only mean that they have the boy. Hawk immediately chases after the bounty hunters, but they encounter the Company robot ship. Programmed for self-defense, the ship reacts to being fired upon and destroys the bounty hunter's ship. Peter survives by using an escape pod which Hawk retrieves.

Back on course to Regulus V, Hawk teaches Peter how to fire the ship's lasers using asteroids as target practice. Once at the planet, Hawk's crew go after the tanker ships and Hawk says goodbye to Peter. After a battle with security robots, Hawk's crew takes the ships, but nearby, the Company observes the theft with the robot ship and orders it to follow the convoy.

As Amanda travels to take Peter home, her ship is ambushed by Zeriatin's starfighters and crashes on a nearby planet. Amanda is killed by Zeriatin's thugs, and Peter is captured for ransom. Flightplan rescues the boy but is shot by Zeriatin's guards. Peter finds Hawk in the bar with his two remaining crewmen. The station is alerted to the approaching robot ship. The station launches several defense ships in response, but none can stop it. Peter and the remainder of Hawk's crew try to flee the station, but they are confronted by Zeriatin and his men. The last two of Hawk's crew are killed off, and Hawk manages to kill Zeriatin, but not before being shot himself. Peter struggles to help Hawk to his ship where they escape before the station explodes.

The robot ship pursues Hawk's ship. Unable to outrun it, Hawk tells Peter to fire the lasers the moment the robot ship lowers its defenses, which it must do to fire its weapons. Peter successfully destroys the enemy ship. A weakened Hawk returns to consciousness and takes Peter home. A sad and worried Peter disembarks the ship, and Hawk, severely wounded, flies back into space.

Cast
 Vince Edwards as "Hawk"
 David Mendenhall as Peter
 Drew Snyder as Aldebarian
 Patsy Pease as Amanda
 Thom Christopher as "Flightplan"
 Luca Bercovici as "Ace"
 Ray Stewart as Zariatin
 George Dickerson as Tracton
 Dick Miller as Mel "Crazy Mel"
 Virginia Kiser as Janeris
 William Boyett as Taggert

Production
Corman sold New World Pictures in January 1983 for $16.9 million. Under the terms of the contract, he agreed to stay on as consultant for two years and that New World would distribute any movies he made until February 1984. He agreed to provide the company with a minimum of five films they could release. He set up a new production company, Millennium — the title of a 1981 retrospective of Corman's work at the National Film Theatre of London. He announced plans to make films budgeted between $2–5 million using cash from his sale of New World to finance. He wanted to make less commercial films. Millennium's films included Space Raiders, Love Letters, Screwballs and Suburbia (which he acquired).

Release 
The film's trailer was featured as part of the Stephen Romano Presents Shock Festival trailer compilation three-disc set on DVD.

On September 2, 2014, Scorpion Releasing released Space Raiders on DVD as a standard release, and on Blu-ray as a 2,000 unit limited edition.  The Special Features include the film's theatrical trailer and interviews with Roger Corman, star David Mendenhall, and postproduction supervisor Clark Henderson.

Reception
TV Guide stated that the story was a thinly disguised rip-off of Star Wars and was disappointed that it reused both the special effects and the music from Battle Beyond the Stars. The movie was featured on episode 48 of the internet show Best of the Worst produced by RedLetterMedia, where it was unanimously selected as best of the worst. In particular, the panel praised Corman's efficiency in reusing assets and skill in allocating a small budget.

References

External links

 

1980s science fiction action films
American science fiction action films
1983 films
Films scored by James Horner
Films set on spacecraft
New World Pictures films
Fiction set around Procyon
Films produced by Roger Corman
Films set on fictional planets
1980s English-language films
1980s American films